WBT-FM (99.3 MHz) is a commercial radio station licensed to Chester, South Carolina that primarily serves the western region of the Charlotte metropolitan area. The station is owned by Urban One. The station's programming primarily consists of simulcasts of the news/talk radio format of WBT in Charlotte.

WBT-FM was first licensed, as WCMJ, on December 1, 1969. The station is also authorized to broadcast using the digital HD Radio format.

Studios are located at One Julian Price Place on West Morehead Street, just west of Uptown Charlotte, co-located with the city's CBS affiliate WBTV, which previously had common ownership.

Programming

WBT-FM almost always simulcasts its AM sister, WBT (AM), although the two have occasionally carried separate programming.

History

Early years
The station first went on the air in on July 28, 1969, as WCMJ, owned by the York-Clover Broadcasting Company. From 1978 to 1993, the station used the call letters WDZK and was known on the air as "K99" playing a format that, today would be considered adult top 40.

WBT simulcast
Despite its clear-channel status that allows it to reach most of the eastern half of North America at night, WBT (AM)'s nighttime signal is spotty at best in some parts of the Charlotte metropolitan area (particularly the western portion) because it operates with a directional antenna at night in order to avoid interfering with KFAB in Omaha, Nebraska, which also operates on 1110 kHz. To improve its local nighttime coverage, in 1947 WBT began operating a synchronous booster transmitter, located in Shelby, however use of this booster ended in the early 1960s.

In 1995, WBT's then-owner Jefferson-Pilot bought WBZK to provide a better signal to the western part of the market at night. At this time the call letters were changed to WBT-FM. (In 1947, an FM sister station at 99.9 MHz was put on the air. That station was discontinued in the mid-1950s. Sister station WLNK also previously used the call letters WBT-FM. In 2012, WLNK added a simulcast of WBT on its HD subcarrier.

Sale to Entercom
On July 19, 2016, Greater Media announced that it would merge with Beasley Media Group. Because Beasley already had the maximum number of stations in the Charlotte market with 5 FM's and 2 AM's, WBT-AM-FM and WLNK were spun off to a divestiture trust, eventually going to a permanent buyer. On October 18, 2016, Entercom announced that it would purchase WBT AM/FM and WLNK, plus WFNZ. Upon the completion of the Greater/Beasley merger on November 1, Entercom began operating the stations via a time brokerage agreement, which lasted until the sale was consummated on January 6, 2017.

Sale to Urban One
On November 5, 2020, Urban One agreed to a station swap with Entercom in which they would swap ownership of four stations in Philadelphia, St. Louis and Washington D.C. to Entercom in exchange for their cluster of Charlotte stations, including WBT and WBT-FM. As part of the terms of the deal, Urban One took over operations via a local marketing agreement on November 23. The swap was consummated on April 20, 2021.

References

External links
 
 

BT-FM
Urban One stations
News and talk radio stations in the United States
Radio stations established in 1969
1969 establishments in South Carolina